Samuel Chebli (born 28 February 1971 in Liberia) is a Liberian football coach and former footballer.

Malaysia

Participating in the Malaysia Cup with Terengganu FA in 1998, Chebli found the net twice to help the Turtles reach the semi-final of the competition.  However, due to the Football Association of Malaysia's ban on foreigners, he was considered superfluous by the club and returned to Liberia by the end December that year.

International

He has represented the Liberia internationally from 1999 to 2000, making 2 appearances including one against Sudan for a 2002 World Cup qualifier. He is also deputy coach of the Liberia national team as of 2018.

References 

1971 births
Living people
Liberian footballers
Liberian expatriate footballers
Association football midfielders
Liberian expatriate sportspeople in Malaysia
Liberian expatriate sportspeople in Indonesia
Expatriate footballers in Malaysia
Expatriate footballers in Indonesia
Expatriate footballers in Vietnam
Liberian football managers
V.League 1 players
Indonesian Premier Division players
Perak F.C. players
Terengganu FC players
Petrokimia Putra players
Persisam Putra Samarinda players
Long An FC players
Pelita Jaya FC players
Persikota Tangerang players